Zero Style Mint 	(Katakana: ゼロ・スタイル・ミント) is a brand of smokeless cigarette produced by Japan Tobacco. Zero Style Mint consists of a cigarette-shaped pipe into which a small, snuff-like tobacco cartridge is inserted. A set of a stick and two cartridges are priced at 300 Japanese yen and are sold only in Tokyo;  sets of  four refill cartridge sell at  400 yen.

References

Japan Tobacco brands
Products introduced in 2010